TNN ((), also known as TNN16, an acronym for Thai News Network) is a Thai satellite, cable and digital terrestrial 24-hour news channel owned by Thai News Network (TNN) Co., Ltd., a unit of TrueVisions, a subsidiary of True Corporation, part of the Charoen Pokphand Group and Telenor, presents news, documentaries and sport news. 
TNN has a sister channel called TNN2.

History

Earlier History 
TNN was founded as IBC 3 on 17 May 1989. It was the one of the first seven channels broadcasting on IBC satellite television platform on channel 1.

Later, on 1 November 1997, IBC 3 rebranded to IBC News and reformed its format to present news only.

On 1 July 1998, after IBC reached an agreement to merge with the UTV Cable Network and formed UBC, IBC News rebranded to UBC News and continue to broadcast on UBC channel 7. On 1 September 2003, UBC News got a new look, add a new image to consider as a news channel, consistent with the change of the UBC logo.

In 2006, the channel rebranded to UBC News 24, later known as True News 24 as the network was rebranding to TrueVisions in 2007.

TNN 
In 2008, True News 24 rebranded to TNN and split into two channels. TNN24 became a 24-hour news channel and TNN2 now broadcasts in-depth news and documentaries.

TNN24 officially launched on 9 September 2008 on TrueVisions channel 7. The following year, on 9 September 2009, its website was launched.

On 1 January 2010, TNN launched its radio station TNN Radio, broadcast on the Royal Thai Army Radio Station JS 2, Department of Military Communications FM 103.0 MHz, bringing live news programming from TNN24 into a radio format parallel to the television broadcast. It ceased broadcasting in 2011.

In 2010, TNN24 launched its free-to-air service on Thaicom 5 both  and C band and also launch its channel on other subscription television provider, PSI and DTV.

Thai News Network (TNN) Co., Ltd. was established on 17 August 2011 to become the subsidiary of TrueVisions and serves as the owner of the channel.

On 1 March 2012, TNN24 started to air its high-definition channel on TrueVisions cable TV service on channel 124 and expanded to broadcast on satellite service after that.

In April 2014, TNN24 began broadcasting on digital terrestrial television on channel 16 after it was awarded a digital TV license in December 2013.

The channel has the same channel number on every platform due to the Must-carry rule provided by National Broadcasting and Telecommunications Commission (NBTC) but was still broadcast on TrueVisions channel 7 until the NBTC made an order to force TrueVisions to move the channel to number 16 in 2016.

In February 2019, TNN24 rebranded to TNN16, but still broadcast on TrueVisions in HD, Channel 117 and 777 as before. It aims to be the number 1 digital TV business news channel in Thailand and began to merge with some of True4U's news team. Then on 18 November, the same year, expanded the studio for filming more news programs on True Tower 2 Building, Pattanakarn Road, which used alongside its original studio at Tipco Tower, Rama 6 Road, which is currently in use and from 2 January 2020, the channel started its additional channels simulcast on True4U (similar to Sky TG24 simulcast on Cielo in Italy and Now News Channel simulcast on Viu TV in Hong Kong.)

On 3 April 2023, TNN16 moved its office and studios to True Digital Park, Sukhumvit Road, replacing the original studios used in True Tower 2, Phatthanakan Road and Tipco Tower 2, Rama 6 Road, which was the former office of the channel.

Newscaster

Current 
 Chake Rattanatangtrakul (Pop) (2019–present) (Executive Editor of the News Division)
 Khaunchanok Charoenpakupaisarn (Kae) (2007–present)
 Niratchaya Monthong (Pumpuy) (2008–present)
 Pawinee Sawaengsuk (Aoey) (2021–present)
 Piyaluck Rakpratarnporn (Mu) (2021–present) (Executive Editor of the Business News Division)
 Rawicha Tangsubut (Ritcha) (Original Nickname and Name: Kwang Pimrawee Tangsubut) (2019–present)
 Warunwan Warasint (Ploii) (2020–present)
 Chawan Chandradrabya (Game) (2021–present)
 Polawat Pupipat (New) (2018–present)
 Elizabeth Sadler Leenanuchai (Liza) (2022–present)
 Kanjana Thupjean (Ju) (2014–present)
 Monai Yenbutra (Mo) (2019–present)
 Chonticha Asavanich (Am) (Original Family Name: Sarppaiboonlert) (2019–present)
 Kulacha Tangmahasuk (Pae) (2008–present)
 Thanchanok Jongyotying (Micky) (2019–present) (Executive Editor of the International News Division)
 Phat Jintanakun (Pui) (2019–present)
 Supaporn Eldredge (Kookai) (2020–present)
 Varin Sachdev (Vee) (2003–present)
 Jessada Salathong (Jess) (2020–present)
 Nattachar Kijmoke (Minnie) (2022–present)
 Pichayapa Sutabutra (Grace) (2022–present)
 Sophon Nawarattanapong (Jia) (2021–present)
 Chayathip Lojanakosin (Yuu) (2016, 2022–present)
 Banphot Thanapermsuk (Eig) (2019–present)
 Titikorn Tipmontien (Tak) (2020–present)
 Thawanrat Denlertchaikul (Ammy) (2020–present)
 Sinida Petchveerakul (Palmy) (2021–present)
 Taweerat Jiradilok (Ann) (2010-2017, 2019–present)
 Nuttapong Namsirikul (Pop) (2021–present)
 Monchai Wongkittikraiwan (Lek) (2019–present)
 Wanvanissh Passorntanapichai (Praew) (Original Name: Sineenart Swadpoon) (2019–present)
 Passavee Thitiphonwattanakul (Pen) (2019–present)
 Jiratti Kuntipalo (Pub) (2022–present)
 Sukunya Chaipasee (Neng) (2019–present) (Executive Editor of the ASEAN News Division and also the expert of ASEAN 4.0 Online every Sunday)
 Sopa Chantarumai (Joy) (2021–present) (host of the morning edition of TNN Wealth Live every Monday to Friday and TNN Wealth Weekly every Sunday)
 Thanawan Panthachot (Muay) (2021–present) (host of the afternoon edition of TNN Wealth Live every Monday to Friday and TNN Wealth Weekly every Sunday)
 Chutima Jirasubanan (Aing) (2016-2017, 2022–present) (host of TNN Wealth Weekly every Saturday)
 Anthiya Naetirapeesak (Deedee) (Original Name: Reawadee Sae-tan) (2014–present)
 Thunramon Paisarnsoontornkit (Pae) (2014–present) (Reung Dee Dee Thua Thai reporter on Sunday)
 Theerayut Bannongsa (Fluke) (2020–present) (Executive Editor of the Sport News Division)
 Parnsit Vichayakupt (Tum) (2018–present)
 Pathomphob Inbamrung (Thomm) (2022–present)
 Parin Jeasuwan (It) (Original Name: Pitchan) (2014–present)
 Klanarong Machoke (Kla) (2020–present)
 Adisorn Piungya (Jackie) (2019–present)
 Rittikorn Karawek (Oat) (2019–present)
 Natchawee Wanitsurang (Nat) (Original Name: Sujaree Theparwut (Su) and later Nutcharee Pattanawongpokin) (1998–present)
 Chart Pattanakulkarnkit (Bank) (2021–present)
 Panadda Prasithimaykul (Aui) (2014–present) (host of Panadda Story segment on TNN Morning News every Monday to Wednesday)
 Palida Hongkrajang (Praew) (2021–present)
 Chatdao Jangwangkorn (Dao) (2021–present)
 Chol Wachananont (Cholly) (2013-2019, 2020–present) (Executive Editor of the Technology News Division)
 Ekachai Tananchai (Gun) (2022–present)
 Suhatcha Swatdiponphallop (Tang) (2022–present) (Executive Editor of the Weather News Division)
 Sunida Swatdiponphallop (Toey) (2022–present) (Executive Editor of the Weather News Division)
 Natthiprada Eurpibulwatana (Pan) (2012–present) (Signed under Media Associated's Money & Banking Channel (formerly known as Money & Banking Television))
 Vimonwan Setthatavorn (Ying) (2012–present) (Signed under Media Associated's Money & Banking Channel (formerly known as Money & Banking Television))
 Chaiya Yimwilai (2020–present)

Former 
 Kritika Korpaibul (Kuk) (2008-2011)
 Jirayu Chudhabuddhi (Game) (2008-2014) (now at JKN-CNBC and JKN18)
 Shanwit Chaisiriwong (Zen) (2012-2015)
 Angkanang Maimongkol (Aoy) (2008-2021) (now at Amarin TV)
 Pimwijit Sopon (Pim) (2008-2014)
 Nattakorn Devakula (Pleum) (2008-2009) (now at Voice TV)
 Suthipongse Thatphithakkul (Heart) (2008-2016)
 Chamanun Wanwinwasara (Ake) (2010-2012)
 Baramee Nawanopratsakul (Yod) (2008-2009)
 Siriboon Nattapan (Ying) (2014-2018) (now a freelance host and the owner of Sarasilp Thaivision)
 Damrong Puttan (2017-2018)
 Cholvit Jearajit (2017-2018)
 Kanda Srithamupatham (Nan) (2010-2016)
 Sujitra Amitphai (Jay) (2008-2011) (now a Deputy Head of Customer Service Management at Charoen Pokphand Group)
 Suttada Natiphanon (Buddy) (2013-2015)
 Wanchai Sornsiri (2011-2013, 2016-2019)
 Ratchapong Lhaowanich (Koh) (2016-2019) (now at JKN-CNBC and JKN18)
 Panpilai Pukahuta (Oh) (2014-2022) (now a producer for health-related programs on TNN16)
 Nattichakorn Kalumpranun (Oil) (2008-2020) (now at Suwannabhumi TV)
 Patchara Chanthawanich (Jade) (Original Name: Jessada Chandranakee and later Puwanetnarin Chandranakee) (2008-2014)
 Supatra Somthawanich (Mam) (2004-2019) (now at Suwannabhumi TV)
 Thitinan Chaninwong (Nong) (2004-2018)
 Salilathip Thippayakraisorn (Nint) (2008-2017) (now a Consultant at CP All)
 Puwanart Kunpalin (Un) (2008-2014)
 Prasoppasok Kongsilp (Mei) (2008-2018)
 Laphatnitsa Worapakdee (Mod) (2018-2019)
 Jakkarat Chotidamrong (Earth) (2008-2018) (now a voice actor at TrueVisions)
 Tosapong Rattana (Tos) (2008-2018) (now a sports commentator at TrueVisions)
 Khemasorn Nukao (Milk) (2007-2008) (now at Thairath TV)
 Pat Jungkankul (Lookbid) (2018-2019) (now at PPTV)
 Parada Thanasrichai (Mail) (2008-2013)
 Ornlada Phaowibul (Jeab) (2009-2015)
 Pattanapong Saengtham (Pat) (2015-2019)
 Chanyar Pakornpat (Chanyar) (2008-2014) (now at Channel 8)
 Chairat Thomya (2000-2001, 2007-2008) (now at NHK World)
 Arisara Kumthorncharoen (Muay) (2008-2014) (now at Channel 3)
 Theppakit Chatsuriyawong (Pikth) (2019-2020) (now at Channel 8)
 Sutthida Ketwit (Phueng) (2008-2019)
 Tin Chokkamolkij (Tin) (2012-2019) (now at Channel 7)
 Worraporn Sansuk (Ae) (2014-2015) (now at Channel 8)
 Kitthikorn Silapadontree (Benz) (2015-2019) (now at Workpoint TV)
 Nuttanant Temchotikosol (Kwan) (Original Name: Thanyarat) (2018-2019) (now at Thairath TV)
 Chalermporn Tantikanjanakul (Boyz) (2012-2014) (now at MCOT HD)
 Sataporn Riyapa (Au) (2008-2013) (now at Channel 8)
 Siranuch Rojanasthien (Jan) (2008-2017) (now a Vice President of Corporate Communications at AIA)
 Chanitnun Punnanithi (May) (2000-2019) (now at Channel 8)
 Warinmat Panyadee (Guitar) (2016-2019) (now at JKN-CNBC and JKN18)
 Suchathip Chirayunon (Ploy) (2004-2019) (now at JKN18)
 Suphinya Roopkhamdee (Suki) (2004-2018) (now a Manager of Communication, Organization and Publicity at Charoen Pokphand Foods)
 Sasicha Rattanathawon (Ae) (2008-2011)
 Rampirat Chanhom (2008-2014)
 Samparn Sirijiwanon (2008-2014)
 Patcholathorn Worrathamwong (2008-2014)
 Chawanluck Derekwattananukul (Fai) (2011-2014)
 Ponpareuk Reungjarat (2008-2014)
 Nicha Reungkade (Fai) (2014-2017)
 Prasobchok Kongsilp (Meay) (Original Family Name: Serngwongsat) (2014-2018)
 Paworn Kitcharoenkarnkul (2014-2017)
 Paksincha Rai (Punpun) (2014-2017)
 Sumita Jantaro (Bonne) (2014-2017)
 Jiraporn Kuhakarn (2014-2017)
 Yanichsa Sirimulakul (Pen) (2014-2018)
 Danai Kertmongkol (2014-2017)
 Wuttipan Paeramasawad (Fluke) (2008-2017)
 Natwarin Thongprasert (Ying) (2008-2018)
 Nattapan Reungchan (Aom) (2014-2015)
 Kittima Wongsawad (Maysa) (2014-2015)
 Chinnawat Surussavadee (2015-2016)
 Natchanan Sonthi (2015-2018)
 Jitsupa Chin (Sueching) (2019-2020) (now at Spin9)
 Atichan Chernsawano (Au) (2019-2020) (now at Spin9)
 Ticha Suthitham (Sos) (2004-2010)
 Mechaka Supichayangkul (Zen) (2011-2014) (now at Channel 3)
 Rynn Yongwattana (Lin) (2008-2018)
 Chareeda Phromyothi (Pomme) (Original Name: Parichart) (2019) (now a Foreign News Editor at eFinanceThai)
 Chanida Prasomsuk (Mameow) (2011-2013, 2019) (now at JKN-CNBC and JKN18)
 Kamolchanok Pukayaporn (Ant) (2019)
 Siratthaya Issarabhakdi (Fern) (Original Family Name: Chaechew) (2019-2020) (now at Wealth Me Up and The Standard Wealth)
 Wit Sittivaekin (Wit) (2019-2020) (now at The Standard Wealth)
 Suthichai Yoon (2019) (now at Suthichai Live, Thai PBS and PPTV)
 Naowarat Charoenpraphin (Nao) (2019-2021) (now at Money Chat)
 Orakarn Jivakiet (Kwang) (2020) (now at Nation TV)
 Atishart Wongwuttiwat (Ong) (2016-2021) (now at Nation TV)
 Suta Sudhepichetpun (Nui) (2019-2021) (now at MCOT HD)
 Suthakorn Suthisonthi (2020-2021)
 Kanyarat Pimsawat (Doy) (2008-2021) (now at GMM25)
 Mattanin Maneekhao (Mook) (Original Name: Thanikarn) (2018-2021) (now a freelance host)
 Kreangkraimas Photjanasuntorn (Kendo) (2019-2021) (now at PPTV)
 Kamonphorn Worrakul (Kae) (2019-2021) (now at Amarin TV)
 Amornrat Mahitthirook (2020-2021) (now at MCOT HD)
 Samittra Kleabbuppha (Lookpla) (2021)
 Arithatch Thangsanga (Kang) (2021)
 Natchaya Sanguansuk (Lookapad) (2021-2022) (now at Channel 8)
 Sarut Vithuwinit (Chai) (2018-2022) (now a sports commentator at TrueVisions and NBT)
 Chamaiporn Heanprasert (Yui) (2018-2022) (now at Thai PBS, T Sports 7 and Main Stand)
 Watit Trikrutaphan (Tob) (2016-2022) (now at Channel 7)

Identity

Logos

Slogans
 2010-2019: ทันทุกความจริง (Keep Up with All Facts)
 2019–present: ทันโลก ทันเศรษฐกิจ ทันทุกความจริง (Keep Up with the World, Economy and All Facts) (used for main purposes)
 2022–present: ทันโลก ทันเศรษฐกิจ ทันทุกความจริง ทันทุกแพลตฟอร์ม (Keep Up with the World, Economy, All Facts and All Platforms) (used for other purposes, as well as the monthly program schedule update on the website)

References

External links

Charoen Pokphand
True Corporation
24-hour television news channels in Thailand
24-hour television news channels
Television stations in Thailand
Television channels and stations established in 2008
Television channels and stations established in 1989